Fatah Said is a Moroccan professional footballer who plays as a midfielder for Wydad Casablanca.

International career
In January 2014, the Moroccan national football team coach Hassan Benabicha invited Said to be a part of the squad for the 2014 African Nations Championship. He helped the team to top group B after they drew with Burkina Faso and Zimbabwe, and defeated Uganda. The team was eliminated from the competition at the quarter final stage after losing to Nigeria.

References

Living people
Moroccan footballers
Morocco A' international footballers
2014 African Nations Championship players
1986 births
Wydad AC players
Association football midfielders